This is a list of flag bearers who have represented the Dominican Republic at the Olympics.

Flag bearers carry the national flag of their country at the opening ceremony of the Olympic Games.

See also
Dominican Republic at the Olympics

References

Dominican Republic at the Olympics
Dominican Republic
Olympic flagbearers
Olympic flagbearers